Eileen Rose Busby (August 15, 1922 – April 6, 2005) was an American author and antiques expert who was featured on HGTV's Appraise It! show.

Early life
Busby was born Eileen May Rose in Two Harbors, Minnesota. Her parents, Frank and Esther Rose, relocated to San Diego while she was still a baby. Busby taught herself to read when she was 3 years old, skipped a grade in school, and graduated from San Diego High School at age 16.

Biography
Busby, who first married James (Jim) Scott and then Richard Busby, often spoke before groups about antiques collecting. She also taught a how-to course for many years at Cuyamaca College and Grossmont College, community colleges in El Cajon, California. She wrote two books about the history and collecting of Royal Winton Porcelain and Cottage Ware. Her third book, Chintz and Pastel Ware, co-authored with daughter Cordelia Mendoza, also an antiques expert and an appraiser, is scheduled for posthumous publication by Schiffer Publishing in 2011. She was scheduled to lecture at the annual Chintz Convention, held in Northern California in April 2005, a month after her death.

Busby's book Cottage Ware is referenced in collector Judith Miller's book Buy, Sell, or Keep, and she is listed in Kovels' Yellow Pages.

Busby and her husband, Richard, lived in England for 10 years, some of it spent in a thatched roof cottage, from where they traveled the countryside researching Royal Winton and chintz. Busby wrote articles about their travels while Richard took photos, which were published in Sea magazine and International Yachtsman. While living in England, Busby passed the UK's Mensa exam and became a member. She also taught word processing at a U.S. military base.

Busby was a member of the San Diego chapter of Mensa and the San Diego Press Club, and was featured in 2004 in the Antiques Road Show'''s newsletter. In 1999, Busby was featured as a collector on HGTV's Appraise It! show, taped at Butterfield & Butterfield's auction house in Los Angeles. She earned a bachelor's degree in sociology at age 62 from State University of New York. Also, she was a member of the San Diego Press Club. Upon her return to the US from England in 1990, she wrote articles for The Collector, Antiques and Collectibles, and West Coast Peddler. She also sold Royal Winton and chintz china pieces, which she had purchased in England, as a dealer at daughter Cordelia Mendoza's antiques store in Ocean Beach. California.

She and Jim Scott had five children, two of whom—J. Michael Scott and Cathy Scott—are also authors. Busby was also the sister of author and Orthodox Christian Hieromonk Father Seraphim Rose and the sister-in-law of former CIA Director Stansfield Turner.

Books
 Royal Winton Porcelain: Ceramics Fit for a King 1998
 Cottage Ware: Ceramic Tableware Shaped As Buildings, 1920s-1990s 2003
 Computer Typing Quick-Quick Type: Ten Easy Lessons : A Short, Simple Beginner or Refresher Course With Handy Reference Section''

References

External links
Eileen Rose Busby official site
Amazon's Author Page
San Diego Union-Tribune obituary
The Collector obituary
Listed in Official Guide to Flea Market Prices, 2nd ed
"Remembering Eileen Busby," San Diego Press Club's Foghorn
Publisher's book page for Cottage Ware

1922 births
2005 deaths
People from Two Harbors, Minnesota
Antiques experts
American collectors
Women collectors
American antiquarians
Writers from San Diego
20th-century American historians
Mensans
American women historians
20th-century American women writers
Writers from Minnesota
Historians from California
20th-century antiquarians
21st-century American women
San Diego High School alumni